Li Zhe (born 20 June 1981 in Shenyang) is a retired Chinese professional football defender.

Club career
Li Zhe started his football career with his hometown football club Liaoning FC's youth team where he would go on to be promoted to the club's second team named Liaoning Xingguang in the 2002 Chinese league season. The club Liaoning Xingguang were allowed to play within the second tier of the Chinese football pyramid and within his debut season Li would go on to aid the club finish sixth within the league at the end of the campaign. In the 2003 league season Liaoning FC would decide to sell Liaoning Xingguang to the SVT Group who formed a new club called Nanjing Yoyo. This saw the whole squad move to Nanjing as part of the deal and Li would stay with Nanjing Yoyo for several seasons where he established himself as regular within the team as they achieved mid-table mediocrity.

On July 21, 2010 Li and the entire first team of Nanjing Yoyo went on strike because of unpaid wages amounting up to 8 million Yuan, before a league game against Guangzhou Evergrande and this saw the club's youth players used as they were thrashed a Chinese record of 10-0. The first team would not be able resolve their wage dispute with the club and the team ultimately went on a losing streak that saw them relegated. With the club in continued financial difficulties and still unable to pay their players they disbanded in 2011. At the start of the 2011 league season he was free to join second tier club Shenzhen Phoenix before they moved to Guangzhou and changed their name to Guangzhou R&F. With his new club he would win promotion with them and in the 2012 Chinese Super League he would score his first league goal for the club on March 10, 2012 against Beijing Guoan in a 3-1 victory. He was sent to reserved squad in the 2015 season and retired from football in January 2016.

Career statistics
Statistics accurate as of match played 1 November 2015

References

External links

Player profile at Sodasoccer.com

1981 births
Living people
Footballers from Shenyang
Chinese footballers
Nanjing Yoyo players
Guangzhou City F.C. players
Association football defenders
Chinese Super League players
China League One players